The Oakwood Health System was a group of 4 hospitals and dozens of medical clinics across the Metro Detroit Area. In 2014, Oakwood Health System merged with Beaumont Health System and Botsford Hospital to form Beaumont Health.

History 
In 1989, Oakwood Healthcare merged with United Care.

In 2014, Oakwood Health System merged with Beaumont Health System and Botsford Hospital to form Beaumont Health.

Hospitals 

Oakwood provided acute, specialty, primary and preventative care services, with four acute care hospitals and more than 50 outpatient facilities, 9,000 employees and 1,300 physicians.

The hospitals within the Oakwood Health System include:

Beaumont Hospital - Dearborn Dearborn, Michigan
Beaumont Hospital - Wayne Wayne, Michigan
Beaumont Hospital - Taylor Taylor, Michigan
Beaumont Hospital - Trenton Trenton, Michigan

Teen Health Centers 
Youth in the community can receive healthcare through the Oakwood Teen Health Centers. They provide a wide variety of services through school-based and school-linked programs.

There are three teen health centers and two elementary school clinics:
Oakwood Inkster Teen Health Center 
Oakwood Romulus Teen Health Center at Romulus High School
Oakwood Taylor Teen Health Center Southgate, Michigan
Jefferson-Barns Elementary School Clinic in Wayne-Westland
Lincoln Elementary School Clinic in Wayne-Westland

References 

Healthcare in Michigan
Metro Detroit
Economy of Metro Detroit
Hospital networks in the United States